Go Records (usually badged as Go!! Records) was a small independent Melbourne-based recording label which ran from 1964 to 1968. Its releases were manufactured and distributed by the Melbourne-based recording and electronics company Astor.

The Go!! label was established by the producers of the similarly named The Go!! Show, Horrie Dargie, Arthur Young and Johnny Tillbrook (known as 'DYT Productions'). The label was noted for its cross-promotion of singers with the television show.

The label produced 54 singles but with only limited commercial success.  Bands awarded contracts included  The Cherokees, The Deakins, MPD Ltd, Tony & The Shantels (from Shepparton, Victoria), The Chosen Few (South Australia), and The Clique (Perth).  One band, The Rondells, included several members who went on to form the rhythm section of Daddy Cool.  
 
Another group, The Strangers provided backing for the solo singers who appeared on The Go!! Show as well as performing their own material which was released on the Go!! label. Lead guitarist John Farrar went on to produce and write songs for Olivia Newton-John, most notably for the films Xanadu and Grease.

See also

List of record labels

References

External links
http://www.milesago.com/industry/go-label.htm

Australian independent record labels
Record labels based in Melbourne